Kohneh Van Sara (also Romanized as Kohneh Vān Sarā) is a village in Rostamabad-e Shomali Rural District, in the Central District of Rudbar County, Gilan Province, Iran. At the 2006 census, its population was 19, in 9 families.

References 

Populated places in Rudbar County